Laura Moriarty may refer to:
 Laura Moriarty (poet and novelist) (b. 1952), California resident, and author of Two Cross Seizings (1980)
 Laura Moriarty (novelist) (b. 1970), Hawaii and Kansas resident, and author of The Center of Everything (2004), ''The Rest of Her Life (2007), and While I'm Falling (2009)